= Rabochaya Molva =

Bolshevik legal political and literary newspaper

Rabochaya Molva (Worker's Word) was a Bolshevik legal political and literary newspaper, publication of which was begun in St. Petersburg on March 1, 1907. On the day the first issue appeared it was confiscated and its publication forbidden.
